John Milner was an American baseball player.

John Milner may also refer to:

 John T. Milner (1826–1898), U.S. industrialist, railroad tycoon
 John Milner (nonjuror) (1628–1702), English clergyman
 John Milner (footballer) (born 1942), English former professional footballer
 John Milner (bishop) (1752–1826), English Roman Catholic bishop and writer
 John Milner (magician), British magician, stage and TV performer
 John Milner, a character in the 1973 film American Graffiti

See also
 John Milnor (born 1931), American mathematician
 John Millner (born c. 1951), Illinois State Senator (2005-2013)